Bolacalıkoyuncu is a village in Silifke district of Mersin Province, Turkey. It is almost merged to Taşucu a town to the west. The population of Bolacalıkoyuncu   is 849  as of 2011. The name of the village is composed of two words. Bolacalı refers to a cross bred goat (Boer goat and a local breed from Van)  and koyuncu means sheepman. But the village economy depends mostly on fruit and vegetable farming.

References

Villages in Silifke District